Andrea Marić (born 6 October 1997 in Posušje, Bosnia and Herzegovina) is a Croatian female professional basketball player on Cinkarna Celje.  She previously played for Posušje, Novi Zagreb and Trešnjevka 2009.

References

External links
Profile at eurobasket.com

1997 births
Living people
People from Posušje
Croats of Bosnia and Herzegovina
Croatian women's basketball players
Centers (basketball)
ŽKK Novi Zagreb players
Croatian expatriate basketball people in Slovenia